Justin R. Cronin (October 9, 1980 – November 11, 2020) was an American politician who served as a Republican member of the South Dakota House of Representatives from January 2009 to 2017 and the South Dakota State Senate from 2017 until his resignation in August 2019 due to health reasons. Cronin won his uncontested seat for an additional term in 2016. He died at his home in Pierre, South Dakota at the age of 40.

Education
Cronin earned his BA in business from the University of St. Thomas.

Elections
2012 Cronin and Representative Charles Hoffman were unopposed for both the June 5, 2012 Republican Primary and the November 6, 2012 General election, where Representative Hoffman took the first seat and Cronin took the second seat with 6,441 (48.5%).
2008 When District 23 incumbent Republican Representative Tom Hackl ran for South Dakota Senate and Justin Davis left the Legislature leaving both District 23 seats open, Cronin ran in the June 3, 2008 Republican Primary; in the five-way November 4, 2008 General election Cronin took the first seat with 5,135 votes (33.54%) and fellow Republican nominee Charles Hoffman took the second seat ahead of Democratic nominees Orland Geigle, Leonard Linde, and Independent candidate Wayne Schmidt.
2010 Cronin and Representative Hoffman were unopposed for both the June 8, 2010 Republican Primary and the November 2, 2010 General election, where Cronin took the first seat with 5,343 votes (52.61%) and Representative Hoffman took the second seat.

Session committees 
Cronin was the vice-chair of the Government Operations and Audit Committee; a member of the Committee on Appropriations; and a member of the Joint Committee on Appropriations.

References

External links
Official page  at the South Dakota Legislature
 

1980 births
2020 deaths
Republican Party members of the South Dakota House of Representatives
People from Potter County, South Dakota
Politicians from Sioux Falls, South Dakota
21st-century American politicians
University of St. Thomas (Minnesota) alumni